George Mikell (born Jurgis Mikelaitis; 4 April 1929 – 12 May 2020) was a Lithuanian-Australian actor and writer best known for his performances as Schutzstaffel (SS) officers in The Guns of Navarone (1961) and The Great Escape (1963). Mikell appeared in over 30 British and American feature films and had numerous leading roles in theatre.

After retiring from acting, Mikell wrote two film scripts, numerous short stories and in 2002 published an essay of his 2001 trip to the North-West Frontier Province of Pakistan.

Selected filmography

 The One That Got Away (1957) – German Prisoner
 Kill Her Gently (1957) – Lars Svenson
 Sea of Sand (1958) – German Officer
 Operation Bullshine(1959) – German Airman
 Carve Her Name with Pride (1959) - German Officer (uncredited)
 Whirlpool (1959) – German Policeman
 The Treasure of San Teresa (1959) – Border guard
 Jackpot (1960) – Carl Stock
 Beyond the Curtain (1960) – Pieter von Seefeldt
 A Circle of Deception (1960) – German Officer (uncredited)
 The Guns of Navarone (1961) – Capt. Sessler
 Highway to Battle (1961) – Brauwitz
 The Primitives (1961) – Claude
 The Password Is Courage (1962) – Necke
 Mystery Submarine (1963) – Lt. Remer
 The Gentle Terror (1963) – Turk
 The Great Escape (1963) – Capt. Dietrich
 The Victors (1963) – Russian Sentry
 Operation Crossbow (1965) – German Officer at V2 Launch
 The Spy Who Came in from the Cold (1965) – Checkpoint Charlie Guard
 Dateline Diamonds (1965) – Paul Verlekt
 Raiders of the Sahara (1965) – Ronald Wayne
 Where the Spies Are (1966) – Assassin
 Sabina V'Hagvarim (1966) 
 The Double Man (1967) – Max Gruner
 Attack on the Iron Coast (1968) – Captain Strasser
 Doppelgänger (1969) – Paris Delegate Clavel
 Zeppelin (1971) – German Officer
 Young Winston (1972) – Field Cornet (uncredited)
 Scorpio (1973) – Dor
 The Tamarind Seed (1974) – Major Stukalov
 Sweeney 2 (1978) – Superintendent
 The Sea Wolves (1980) – Ehrenfels Captain
 Escape to Victory (1981) – POW Camp Commander 
 Code Name: Emerald (1985) – Major Seltz
 Night of the Fox (1990) – Maj. Hecker

References

External links
 
 

1929 births
Australian male film actors
Australian people of Lithuanian descent
Australian screenwriters
Australian male short story writers
Australian male stage actors
2020 deaths
Lithuanian male film actors
Lithuanian screenwriters
Male screenwriters
Lithuanian short story writers
Lithuanian male stage actors
20th-century Lithuanian male actors
Lithuanian male writers